Salem Evangelical Church may refer to: 
 Salem Evangelical Church, built 1942 in Rolling Meadows, Illinois
 Salem Evangelical Church, built 1862 in Blue Earth, Minnesota
 Salem Evangelical Church, part of the German United Evangelical Church Complex in Rochester, New York
 Salem Evangelical Church (Milwaukee, Wisconsin), listed on the NRHP in Wisconsin
 Salem Evangelical Church (Plain, Wisconsin), listed on the NRHP in Wisconsin

See also
 German Evangelical Salem Church, listed on the NRHP in Le Sueur County, Minnesota
Salem Church (disambiguation)
 Salem Cemetery (disambiguation)